Kevin Elder Pereira (born December 28, 1982) is an American television personality and host.

Early life
While he was 14, Pereira hosted Pointless Audio under the pseudonym Captain Immy. The show featured many prank calls and was hosted on such gaming sites as Planet Quake and ShugaShack (now Shacknews); it later evolved into Pointless TV, and finally LickMySweaty.com. One of the projects featured on the latter site, a short film created for his video production class at Deer Valley High School, earned him three California Media Festival awards in 2001. A different film project was recognized in 2002. He studied film and television production with a scholarship to the Academy of Art University in San Francisco, California for one semester.

Career
After working as a network administrator at an Internet service provider for five years and also at a television network, he pursued a career at G4. He started as a production assistant in 2002 on the talk show G4tv.com, then moved on to Arena and Pulse and then quickly moved to another G4 show, The Screen Savers, in 2004. Pereira was a co-host of Attack of the Show!, G4's live tech info show, and was the last original cast member to leave. He co-hosted the show for a year with Sarah Lane, who left in 2006, followed by Olivia Munn, who left in 2010. In 2011 Candace Bailey joined Pereira as co-host. He hosted his last episode of Attack of the Show! on May 31, 2012, after it was announced on May 8, 2012, by G4 that his final broadcast would take place on that day. His final broadcast for the channel was their Electronic Entertainment Expo coverage, preceded by a month-long retrospective of highlights from the show. Pereira also produced a show for SyFy titled Viral Video Showdown.

He formerly hosted the syndicated quiz show Let's Ask America until 2014, when MTV VJ Bill Bellamy took over. On October 4, 2012, Pereira launched his podcast Pointless on the Deathsquad podcast network, but later moved to hosting his podcast on SuperCreative.

Pereira appeared as a co-host on the political webshow The Young Turks on February 4, 2013, alongside long-time co-host of the show Ana Kasparian.

Pereira was the co-host of Hack My Life that ended in 2018, on TruTV with Brooke Van Poppelen.

On February 12, 2021, G4 announced that Pereira would return to host Attack of the Show! on the relaunched network.
In September 2022, he announced he would be leaving the network; his last day was September 21, 2022.
Upon hosting on the new G4 Kevin’s participation slowly began to get sparse and eventually he went on a hiatus and soon after G4 closed its doors again.

Filmography

Television acting roles And Twitch Roles

Film acting roles

References

External links

 

1982 births
Living people
American game show hosts
People from the San Francisco Bay Area
American people of Portuguese descent
American people of British descent
People from Antioch, California
American agnostics
People in the video game industry
Academy of Art University alumni